This article concerns the period 639 BC – 630 BC.

Events and trends
 639 BC - Interregnum ends and Ancus Marcius becomes the king of Rome.
 637 BC — Sadyattes becomes king of Lydia.
 636 BC — Duke Wen of Jin ascends to power in the State of Jin during the Zhou Dynasty of China.
 635 BC — Alyattes becomes king of Lydia
 632 BC — Cylon, Athenian noble, seizes the Acropolis in a failed attempt to become king.
 632 BC — In the Battle of Chengpu, the Chinese kingdom of Jin and her allies defeat the kingdom of Chu and her allies.
 631 BC — Founding of Cyrene, a Greek colony in Libya (North Africa) (approximate date).

Significant people
 638 BC—Birth of Solon, lawmaker of Athens (approximate date)
 637 BC—Death of Ardys, Lydia
 637 BC—Death of Duke Xiang of Song, China
 635 BC—Birth of Thales, Greek philosopher (d. 543 BC) (approximate date)
 635 BC—Death of Sadyattes, Lydia
 634 BC—Birth of Jehoiakim, 18th king of Judah (approximate date)
 632 BC—Birth of Jehoahaz, 17th king of Judah (approximate date)
 630 BC—Birth of Sappho (approximate date)

References